Dame Patricia Mary Harrison  (née Thomson; born 6 September 1932) is a New Zealand educationalist.

Early life and family
Born in Dunedin on 6 September 1932, Harrison was educated at Otago Girls' High School from 1946 to 1950. She went on to study at Dunedin Teachers' College and the University of Otago, graduating with Master of Arts with second-class honours in 1957.

In 1957, she married Arthur Keith Harrison, and the couple went on to have three children.

Education career
In 1955, Harrison's first teaching post was at Queen's High School, Dunedin, where she became interested in students with special needs. All of her teaching career, apart from three years in Christchurch, was spent in South Dunedin, and she served as principal of Queen's High School, Dunedin from 1975 to 1994.

Community involvement
Since her retirement, Harrison has continued working with young people in Dunedin, helping the vulnerable and those who drop out of formal education, through programmes run by various community organisations including the Otago Youth Wellness Trust, which she founded in 1996.

Between 1983 and 1994, Harrison was a member of the University of Otago Council. She also served as a member of the Otago Regional Council.  Other community roles have included being an executive member of the Dunedin Council of Social Services, and chair of the Otago Regional Access Employment Council.

Honours and awards
In the 1987 Queen's Birthday Honours, Harrison was appointed a Companion of the Queen's Service Order for public services. In 1990, she received the New Zealand 1990 Commemoration Medal, and in 1993 she was awarded the New Zealand Suffrage Centennial Medal. She was made a Distinguished Companion of the New Zealand Order of Merit, for services to education and the community, in the 2001 Queen's Birthday Honours, and following the restoration of titular honours by the New Zealand government in 2009, she accepted redesignation as a Dame Companion of the New Zealand Order of Merit.

References

1932 births
Living people
Schoolteachers from Dunedin
People educated at Otago Girls' High School
University of Otago alumni
Heads of schools in New Zealand
Otago regional councillors
Companions of the Queen's Service Order
Recipients of the New Zealand Suffrage Centennial Medal 1993
Dames Companion of the New Zealand Order of Merit